Valérie Malet (born 7 October 1967 in Reims) is a French sport shooter. She competed in rifle shooting events at the 1988 Summer Olympics.

Olympic results

References

1967 births
Living people
ISSF rifle shooters
French female sport shooters
Shooters at the 1988 Summer Olympics
Olympic shooters of France
Sportspeople from Reims